The Corpus of Electronic Texts, or CELT, is an online database of contemporary and historical documents relating to Irish history and culture. As of 8 December 2016, CELT contained 1,601 documents, with a total of over 18 million words. In 1992, CELT originated from the ashes of an unsuccessful partnership between University College Cork (UCC/NUI) and the Royal Irish Academy (RIA) through a project named  CURIA. According to CELT, the database "caters for academic scholars, teachers, students, and the general public, all over the world".

References

External links
 CELT: Corpus of Electronic Texts

Databases in Ireland
Irish culture
Irish digital libraries
Online databases
University College Cork
Computer-related introductions in 1992
1992 establishments in Ireland
Corpora
Libraries established in 1992